Ecsenius bicolor, commonly known as the flame tail blenny or bicolor blenny, 
is a blenny from the Indo-Pacific. It frequently makes its way into the aquarium trade.

References

External links
 

bicolor
Fish described in 1888